Robert Arnold Uppgren (December 14, 1923 - May 12, 1967) was an American figure skater.  He competed in pair skating with partner Janette Ahrens. He also competed in fours with Ahrens, Mary Louise Premer, and Lyman Wakefield, Jr. and won the 1941 North American title.

By 1967, Uppgren had begun working for the United States Fish and Wildlife Service in its Minneapolis offices. On May 12, he died in a helicopter crash in Leech Lake.

Competitive highlights
(with Ahrens)

Four skating
(with Premer, Uppgren, and Wakefield)

References

Navigation

1923 births
1967 deaths
American male pair skaters
20th-century American people
Victims of helicopter accidents or incidents in the United States
Victims of aviation accidents or incidents in 1967